Fr. Agnel Stadium  is a football stadium located at Vashi, Navi Mumbai, Maharashtra, India. It is located at the premises of Fr. Agnel Multipurpose School and Junior College which was established in the year 1982. The stadium is India's first multi-sport artificial turf ground.

The facilities includes indoor Table Tennis, indoor shooting range, swimming pool, basketball court and Badminton court and has a capacity of around 5,000. It is the home of Fr. Agnel Gymkhana which plays in Super Division MDFA, Mumbai. The football team had been formed again in April 2004. Fr. Agnel is accredited with first residential FIFA-AIFF Academy in India, and it hosted the 61st Basketball Junior Nationals tournament.

References 

Sport in Navi Mumbai
Football venues in Maharashtra
2004 establishments in Maharashtra
Sports venues completed in 2004